In mathematical logic, descriptive set theory (DST) is the study of certain classes of "well-behaved" subsets of the real line and other Polish spaces. As well as being one of the primary areas of research in set theory, it has applications to other areas of mathematics such as functional analysis, ergodic theory, the study of operator algebras and group actions, and mathematical logic.

Polish spaces 

Descriptive set theory begins with the study of Polish spaces and their Borel sets.

A Polish space is a second-countable topological space that is metrizable with a complete metric.  Heuristically, it is a complete separable metric space whose metric has been "forgotten". Examples include the real line , the Baire space , the Cantor space , and the Hilbert cube .

Universality properties 

The class of Polish spaces has several universality properties, which show that there is no loss of generality in considering Polish spaces of certain restricted forms.

 Every Polish space is homeomorphic to a Gδ subspace of the Hilbert cube, and every Gδ subspace of the Hilbert cube is Polish.
 Every Polish space is obtained as a continuous image of Baire space; in fact every Polish space is the image of a continuous bijection defined on a closed subset of Baire space. Similarly, every compact Polish space is a continuous image of Cantor space.

Borel sets 

The class of Borel sets of a topological space X consists of all sets in the smallest σ-algebra containing the open sets of X. This means that the Borel sets of X are the smallest collection of sets such that:
 Every open subset of X is a Borel set.
That is, the class of Borel sets are closed under complementation. 
 If An is a Borel set for each natural number n, then the union  is a Borel set. That is, the Borel sets are closed under countable unions.

A fundamental result shows that any two uncountable Polish spaces X and Y are Borel isomorphic: there is a bijection from X to Y such that the preimage of any Borel set is Borel, and the image of any Borel set is Borel. This gives additional justification to the practice of restricting attention to Baire space and Cantor space, since these and any other Polish spaces are all isomorphic at the level of Borel sets.

Borel hierarchy 

Each Borel set of a Polish space is classified in the Borel hierarchy based on how many times the operations of countable union and complementation must be used to obtain the set, beginning from open sets. The classification is in terms of countable ordinal numbers.
 Every open set is declared to be .

Thus the hierarchy has the following structure, where arrows indicate inclusion.

Regularity properties of Borel sets 

Classical descriptive set theory includes the study of regularity properties of Borel sets. For example, all Borel sets of a Polish space have the property of Baire and the perfect set property.  Modern descriptive set theory includes the study of the ways in which these results generalize, or fail to generalize, to other classes of subsets of Polish spaces.

Analytic and coanalytic sets 

Just beyond the Borel sets in complexity are the analytic sets and coanalytic sets. A subset of a Polish space X is analytic if it is the continuous image of a Borel subset of some other Polish space. Although any continuous preimage of a Borel set is Borel, not all analytic sets are Borel sets. A set is coanalytic if its complement is analytic.

Projective sets and Wadge degrees 

Many questions in descriptive set theory ultimately depend upon set-theoretic considerations and the properties of ordinal and cardinal numbers. This phenomenon is particularly apparent in the projective sets.   These are defined via the projective hierarchy on a Polish space X:
 A set is declared to be  if it is analytic.
 A set is  if it is coanalytic.
 A set A is  if there is a  subset B of  such that A is the projection of B to the first coordinate.
 A set A is  if there is a  subset B of  such that A is the projection of B to the first coordinate. 

As with the Borel hierarchy, for each n, any  set is both  and 

The properties of the projective sets are not completely determined by ZFC. Under the assumption V = L, not all projective sets have the perfect set property or the property of Baire.  However, under the assumption of projective determinacy, all projective sets have both the perfect set property and the property of Baire. This is related to the fact that ZFC proves Borel determinacy, but not projective determinacy.

More generally, the entire collection of sets of elements of a Polish space X can be grouped into equivalence classes, known as Wadge degrees, that generalize the projective hierarchy. These degrees are ordered in the Wadge hierarchy. The axiom of determinacy implies that the Wadge hierarchy on any Polish space is well-founded and of length Θ, with structure extending the projective hierarchy.

Borel equivalence relations 

A contemporary area of research in descriptive set theory studies Borel equivalence relations.   A Borel equivalence relation on a Polish space X is a Borel subset of  that is an equivalence relation on X.

Effective descriptive set theory 

The area of effective descriptive set theory combines the methods of descriptive set theory with those of generalized recursion theory (especially hyperarithmetical theory). In particular, it focuses on lightface analogues of hierarchies of classical descriptive set theory. Thus the hyperarithmetic hierarchy is studied instead of the Borel hierarchy, and the analytical hierarchy instead of the projective hierarchy.  This research is related to weaker versions of set theory such as Kripke–Platek set theory and second-order arithmetic.

Table

See also
Pointclass
Prewellordering
Scale property

References

External links 
 Descriptive set theory, David Marker, 2002. Lecture notes.